Starseeker is a young adult novel written by British author Tim Bowler. It was originally published in 2002 in the UK.

Characters

Luke Stanton is the main character in Starseeker. The book begins with Luke just about to break into Mrs Little's house. He has been threatened and bullied to do this by a group of local boys from his village. In the house, he finds a terrified girl and flees without stealing anything.

Plot

Luke is an extremely gifted pianist, like his father who died two years previously. He is struggling to come to terms with his grief and sense of loss. And when he tries to break into the house again, Mrs Little confronts him. She insists that he help the frightened girl, who is not only blind but also has learning difficulties. Luke's returns to play music for the girl; his playing soothes and calms her. But he becomes aware that Mrs Little kidnapped her and Luke helps to reunite her with her parents. Skin, the leader of the gang, expects Luke to produce valuable items from the house. Skin becomes increasingly violent towards Luke leading to a near fatal attack.

References

External links
Tim Bowler
Oxford University Press
Starseeker at Fantastic Fiction

2002 British novels
British young adult novels
Novels by Tim Bowler
Novels about bullying
Novels about music
Oxford University Press books